Drais is a surname. Notable people with the surname include:

Karl Drais (1785–1851), German inventor
Methkal Abu Drais (born 1983), Jordanian long-distance runner